Jeremiah Alphonsus Beckett (4 June 1886 – 30 May 1943), better known as Jerry Beckett, was an Irish Gaelic footballer who played as a forward for the Cork senior team.

Beckett made his first appearance for the team during the 1907 championship and was a regular member of the starting fifteen for the following ten years. During that time he won one All-Ireland medal and two Munster medals.

At club level Beckett was a multiple county senior championship medal winner with Lees.

Beckett's son, Derry, was a dual All-Ireland medal winner with Cork in the 1940s.

References

1886 births
1943 deaths
Nils Gaelic footballers
Cork inter-county Gaelic footballers
Irish schoolteachers
Winners of one All-Ireland medal (Gaelic football)
People from Iveragh Peninsula